The women's 500 m time trial at the 2010 Dutch National Track Championships in Apeldoorn took place at Omnisport Apeldoorn on December 28, 2010. 14 athletes participated in the contest.

Willy Kanis won the gold medal, Yvonne Hijgenaar took silver and Laura van der Kamp won the bronze.

Competition format
There was no qualification round for this discipline. Consequently, the event was run direct to the final.

Results

Results from wielerpunt.com.

References

Women's 500
Dutch National Track Championships – Women's 500 m time trial